The Ferrari F1/87 is a Formula One racing car used by the Ferrari team during the 1987 Formula One season. The car was driven by Michele Alboreto (number 27) and Gerhard Berger (number 28) and replaced the Ferrari F1/86 used in 1986.

F1/87
Barnard later stated that had he been in charge of designing the car from the start (design had started in 1986 while he was still at McLaren), that he would have come up with a different looking car. However, as he arrived after Brunner had already started design and construction Barnard could not change the design without considerable expense and loss of time.

The F1/87 was an all-new car and was much sleeker looking than its predecessor, the Harvey Postlethwaite designed F1/86, despite no reduction in fuel tank size for 1987. It featured a six-speed gearbox and an all-new 90° 1.5 litre turbocharged V6 engine called the Tipo 033 which replaced the old 120° V6 Tipo 032 which had been in use since .

The car was somewhat quick and competitive at the start of the season but suffered from persistent understeer, but by the time Germany came around a newly designed rear wing had been fitted and the car became even more competitive; it was almost as quick as the Williams-Honda but not as reliable; Gerhard Berger was qualifying inside the top 3 on every race in the season from the next race in Hungary afterwards. Berger scored two victories in the F1/87, the Japanese and Australian Grand Prix, as well as taking three pole positions. The car demonstrated flashes of its potential early in the season with Alboreto for a short time leading the San Marino Grand Prix. However, reliability issues were a major concern. From the Hungarian Grand Prix onwards, Ferrari looked to have a car that was as quick as any of their rivals. Berger challenged Mansell for the lead at the Hungarian Grand Prix before being forced to retire. The Austrian also nearly won the Portuguese Grand Prix before spinning and handing McLaren's Alain Prost his record 28th Grand Prix win (where Berger admitted it was a result of worrying too much about Prost who consequently stated that he believed that Alboreto would not have made the same mistake), and the Mexican Grand Prix which he was leading before reliability issues forced him out once again.

The season finished on a high with dominating victories for Berger in the final two rounds and Alboreto made it a Ferrari 1-2 in Adelaide after Ayrton Senna's Lotus-Honda was disqualified for oversized brake ducts. Berger's wins also gave Ferrari its first back to back wins since the late Gilles Villeneuve had won the Monaco and Spanish Grands Prix (Rounds 6 and 7) in 1981. As a result, Ferrari went into 1988 as one of the favourites for the championship.

F1/87/88C
For , the car was updated to conform to the new regulations and renamed the F1/87/88C. The car also featured new front and rear wings and a slightly lower engine cover due to the reduction in the fuel tank limit from 195 to 150 litres. The drivers Michele Alboreto and Gerhard Berger finished third and fifth in the driver's championship with Ferrari finishing second to McLaren in the Constructors Championship. The F1/87/88C scored one pole position at the British Grand Prix at Silverstone and one victory at the Italian Grand Prix in Monza.

Although it was one of the most powerful cars of the 1988 field at around  @ 12,000 rpm, the F1/87/88C's biggest problem was fuel consumption compared to the rival Honda engines used by McLaren. Unlike Honda who had built a completely new V6 engine to cope with both the reduced fuel limit of 150 litres and the lower turbo limit of 2.5 bar, Ferrari had only updated 1987's Tipo 033 V6 engine (dubbed Tipo 033A in 1988).

This was clearly shown at the British GP. Pole sitter Berger led for the field together with McLaren's Ayrton Senna, building up a large cushion over the rest of the field before being forced to back off to conserve fuel (when Senna passed him on lap 14, Berger's fuel readout already showed him he would run out at least 5 laps before race end). While Senna went on to a comfortable win in very wet conditions Berger was forced to drive slower and slower, as evidenced when easily passed by the Benetton Ford V8 of Alessandro Nannini on the Hanger Straight. Despite dropping turbo boost to its lowest possible setting, cutting back on engine revs and short shifting, Berger still ran out of fuel coming out of the Woodcote Chicane on the last lap. As a result, he fell from 6th to 9th, being passed by the Arrows-Megatron's of Derek Warwick and Eddie Cheever and the Williams-Judd of Riccardo Patrese in the space of about 400 metres. Alboreto, who had not been running at Berger's pace, had already run out of fuel 3 laps from the finish.

Both Berger and Alboreto being forced to back off because of fuel consumption problems were a feature of the team's 1988 season, although the problem seemed to have been righted to some extent before the team's surprise 1-2 at Monza.

Early in the season, the team's Technical Director John Barnard had recommended to the team's engineers that to improve fuel consumption they reduce the Tipo 033A's rpm's by 1,000 and re-map the engine to compensate for the loss in power. Unfortunately, Barnard's relationship with the team was strained as he didn't work out of the factory in Maranello as was traditional, but instead worked at the Ferrari Technical Office he had set up in Guildford in England. Barnard did this not wanting to move his young family out of England to a very different social environment in Italy, and so as to be able to work away from the distractions of the factory (and reportedly to be away from the Ferrari loving Italian press who were also notoriously quick to condemn failures, of which there were many in the early days of his radical  car). After joining the team in 1987 he had also banned wine from the team's lunch table at both testing and races, a move which proved unpopular with Ferrari's mostly Italian mechanics. Consequently, his advice on the engine was ignored and the team continued to struggle on fuel consumption (this was despite his past history in developing the formidable TAG-Porsche engine formerly used by McLaren). It was not until before the German Grand Prix that changes were made to the engines which happened to match Barnard's original suggestions. Predictably the result of the changes was better fuel economy without power loss, though the Ferrari V6 was still thirstier than the Honda's.

The fastest recorded 'atmo' car was the Judd engined March 881 which recorded . Early in the season both Berger and Alboreto had complained about the lack of top end power from their cars (they were backed up by speed trap figures), but a revised plenum chamber introduced for the Canadian Grand Prix improved this and from then the F1/87/88C's were often among the fastest cars in a straight line, though like their fuel consumption the Tipo 033A could not match the Honda V6 for acceleration.

After taking pole at Silverstone, Berger put his achievement into perspective, stating that the ultra-fast circuit suited the Ferrari with its emphasis on outright top end horsepower and not so much on acceleration. He correctly predicted that at Hockenheim the McLarens would be back on top, which proved correct despite the Ferrari's speed on the straights (in Germany, the circuit's Stadium section and the three chicanes breaking up the straights was where the Ferrari's lost some 1.5 seconds per lap to the McLarens). The Tipo 033A engine, while having good top end power, suffered from poor throttle response and a lack of low end power compared to the Honda's.

While using the F1/87 and 88C for the races during the 1987 and 1988 seasons, behind the scenes Ferrari were developing John Barnard's revolutionary 3.5 litre normally aspirated V12 semi-automatic Ferrari 640 which would make its debut in the 1989 season when turbo powered engines were banned from F1. Initially it was hoped that the V12 car would make its race debut in 1988, but continual problems with the semi-automatic gearbox that would haunt the team during the first half of 1989 (or more specifically, problems with the electrical system that controlled the unique 7 speed box) meant the team was forced to use the F1/87/88C for all of 1988. A modified version of the F1/87/88C was initially used as a test mule for the new V12 engine and semi-automatic gearbox until the Ferrari 639 test car, and later the 640, first appeared for testing late in 1988.

Complete Formula One results
(key) (results shown in bold indicate pole position; results in italics indicate fastest lap)

References

External links

F1 87